Paula Lynette Berry (born February 18, 1969, in John Day, Oregon) is a retired javelin thrower from the United States. She represented her native country at the 1992 Summer Olympics, finishing in 23rd place in the final rankings. She set her personal best (61.60 metres) on May 23, 1991, in Eugene, Oregon with the old javelin type.
Inducted later at the University of Oregon's Athletic "Hall of Fame," she currently coaches track at Bucknell University in Pennsylvania.

International competitions

References

1969 births
Living people
American female javelin throwers
Athletes (track and field) at the 1992 Summer Olympics
Athletes (track and field) at the 1995 Pan American Games
Olympic track and field athletes of the United States
Track and field athletes from Oregon
People from Grant County, Oregon
Universiade medalists in athletics (track and field)
Universiade bronze medalists for the United States
Medalists at the 1991 Summer Universiade
Pan American Games track and field athletes for the United States
21st-century American women